Lorrae Desmond  (born Beryl Hunt; 2 October 1929 – 23 May 2021) was an Australian Gold Logie-award-winning singer, recording artist, radio and television presenter, character actor, and playwright, with a career that spanned over 55 years both locally and in the United Kingdom.
 
She started her career in England, in the vein of entertainer Cicely Courtneidge. Desmond carved out a career as a variety performer, as a singer and radio/television presenter, primarily at the BBC, where she had her own shows during World War II.
 
Returning to Australia, she became a popular presenter and remains best known to early local television audiences as hostess of the musical variety program The Lorrae Desmond Show from 1960 until 1964.  As a variety entertainer and vocalist, she made numerous cabaret and TV appearances including In Melbourne Tonight, The Graham Kennedy Show, The Kamahl Show, The Ted Hamilton Show and appeared on Parkinson in Australia, and The Jack Benny Show. 
 
She was subsequently asked to tour South Vietnam with the Entertainment Unit during the Vietnam War.  She also toured the Middle East, Malaysia, Singapore, Kenya and Somalia, where she became known for her live singing performances, billed as a forces sweetheart, in the style of Vera Lynn and Anne Shelton, for which she was honoured with an MBE for services to entertainment.
 
She started taking roles in local soap operas and serials starting from the late 1960s, including a guest role in the Crawford Productions staple series Homicide, and a guest role in Number 96, after which she was given a more permanent role in the ill-fated series Arcade in 1980.

However, she became famous for her long-running role in the television series A Country Practice, as the original character of nurse Shirley Gilroy, appearing in 816 episodes from 1981 to 1992. 
 
In 1997, she briefly guest starred in Home and Away as Isobel Dupre, the mother of Donald Fisher (Norman Coburn). 
 
She had worked as a theatre lyricist, writing the play Honey in 2001, based on the novel Smoky Joe's Cafe by Bryce Courtenay.

Biography

Early life

Desmond was born on 2 October 1929, in the Southern Highlands town of Mittagong, New South Wales, to Alice and Des Hunt. She left Mittagong after the fire season, and briefly lived on an island on the Great Barrier Reef in Queensland. After leaving Mittagong Primary School, she trained as a hairdresser, but inspired by Gracie Fields, decided she wanted to become an entertainer. By the age of 10, Desmond had travelled to Britain with her family.

Music, performing career and radio in Britain

She started her career in England in 1945, as a teenager of a mere 15 as a singing cigarette girl and became a celebrity there. She performed as both a solo artist and with backing group The Rebels, whilst making studio recordings and featured in everything from theatre, cabaret, pantomime, and radio. She had her own shows including several for the BBC, including Meet Lorrae and Swing with Lorrae.

Television in England
In 1957, she competed in the second semi-final of the Festival of British Popular Songs, where the winner got to participate in the Eurovision Song Contest. She also featured in her own comedy series Trouble for Two in 1958, and was in the cast of several of the Terry-Thomas TV specials.

In his book Bounder (2008), Graham McCann states that Desmond might have even married Terry-Thomas, who had been her constant companion for ten years. Instead, the actor married Belinda Cunningham, despite a 26-year age gap between the two. Desmond refuted this in an ABC interview in April 2008, saying that whilst she dated Thomas for 10 years, they would never have married.

Career in Australia

The Lorrae Desmond Show

Returning to Australia in the early sixties, her career kicked off in 1962, as presenter of the self-titled music variety show The Lorrae Desmond Show and in 1961, she made history by being the first woman on television to win the Gold Logie (which was in fact Silver, as women at the time received the Silver Statuette, and men received the Gold Statuette) The Gold Logie award that year was a dual honour, with Tommy Hanlon Jr. also winning the coveted trophy.

She appeared in the TV play Red Peppers.

Service with the Vietnam Entertainment Unit

The Australian Government invited her to tour Vietnam from 1967 to 1971, to entertain the troops. She was widely courted as being the Australian Forces Sweetheart, amongst others including Dinah Lee, Little Pattie, Cathy Wayne, Sylvia Raye, Lynne Fletcher and Jacqui De Paul. Australia didn't have its own honours system at the time, however Desmond was appointed a Member of the Order of the British Empire (MBE) in 1970 for services to "entertainment and the welfare of the Australian Forces in Vietnam".

Television roles

Desmond's television appearances include Homicide and Number 96 (1973) and Arcade (1980), both series written by David Sale, however the latter series was unsuccessful and cancelled after 16 episodes. Later, in 1997, she also had a guest appearance on Home and Away as Isobel Dupre, the mother of regular character Donald Fisher played by Norman Coburn.

A Country Practice - Shirley Gilroy

Desmond, after having appeared in the ill-fated series Arcade, was touted by the Seven Network to appear in their new series A Country Practice which became her best-known role as Shirley Dean Gilroy, and appeared from the series' inception in November 1981 until 1992. In 1984 she won the Logie for Best Supporting Actress for this role. In one of the series' iconic episodes in 1992, Desmond decided to leave the series and the long-running character Shirley was killed off in an off-screen plane crash, with the actress stating she did not want a prolonged death storyline arc like that of Molly Jones (Anne Tenney).

Writing

Desmond co-wrote the lyrics to the musical Man of Sorrows (originally titled Jesus Christ Revolution) which premiered in Melbourne in 1972.

About the industry, she said: What I really wanted to do was write lyrics for songs. I did do a few weeks in Home And Away after ACP, but I'm a bit sick of performing—after you've been doing it for 50 years you're just going around in circles! The thing I liked most about being a performer was putting the act together, which is why I've come back to writing. It's still pleasant to be recognized as Shirley because people are always nice to me. And with those ACP repeats on Hallmark, it goes from generation to generation.

In 2001, she obtained the rights to write the lyrics for a musical play based on Bryce Courtenay's novel Smoky Joe's Cafe, about the effects of the Vietnam War on a veteran. The play, entitled Honey, premiered in 2007 at the Riverside Theatre Parramatta.

She was also a magazine columnist for That's Life; she wrote an article called "Ask Lorrae", in which readers would write in, asking for advice and information.

Desmond took part in an A Country Practice reunion special in 2006, as part of the "Television Turns 50" celebrations, and the series' 30th-anniversary reunion in 2011.
In 2017, Desmond, who was the first female to win a Gold Logie, appeared at the Logie awards, to present an award opposite her cousin's son, Chinese Australian actor and presenter Sam Pang.

One-woman show

Desmond toured Australia, performing in High Society and her own one-woman show.

Personal life
Desmond was married to Sydney surgeon Dr. Alex Gorshenin from 1963 to 1976. They travelled to the United States together, where he continued to study. Prior to her marriage, Desmond was involved in a long-running affair of several years with the English comic actor Terry-Thomas. She died on 23 May 2021, in Gold Coast, Queensland, aged 91.

Awards

Mo Awards
The Australian Entertainment Mo Awards (commonly known informally as the Mo Awards), were annual Australian entertainment industry awards. They recognise achievements in live entertainment in Australia from 1975 to 2016. Lorrae Desmond won one award in that time.
 (wins only)
|-
| 2009
| Lorrae Desmond
| John Campbell Fellowship Award 
| 
|-

Honours

Filmography

Actress

Celebrity appearances

Notes

References

External links
 
 
 Lorrae Desmond at the National Film and Sound Archive

1929 births
2021 deaths
20th-century Australian actresses
20th-century Australian women singers
21st-century Australian women singers
Actresses from New South Wales
Members of the Order of Australia
Australian Members of the Order of the British Empire
Australian soap opera actresses
Gold Logie winners
People from the Southern Highlands (New South Wales)